The Komeutyuyam Range is a range of mountains in Chukotka Autonomous Okrug and Kamchatka Krai, Russian Far East. 

Administratively the northern section of the range belongs to the Anadyr District of Chukotka Autonomous Okrug, and the southern to Olyutorsky District of Kamchatka Krai.

Geography
The Komeutyuyam Range is part of the Koryak Highland system. The valley of the Pikasvayam, the largest tributary of the Ukelayat, marks its southern end.  

Rivers Opuka and Iomrautvaam have their sources in the southern slopes of the Komeutyuyam and the Khatyrka flows along the northern slopes and bends southeastwards at the northeastern end of the range.

See also
Bering tundra
Khatyrka meteorite
List of mountains and hills of Russia

References

External links
Changes on the physical map of Northeast Asia
Mountain - Russia
Koryak Mountains
Landforms of Siberia